Mountain phlox is a common name for several plants and may refer to:

Phlox austromontana, native to the southwestern United States and Baja California
Phlox subulata, native to the eastern and central United States